Ennajie Cruz Laure (born July 31, 1997), better known as EJ Laure, is a Filipino volleyball player. She is a member and a former team captain of the UST Golden Tigresses volleyball team, and a former Philippine national team member.

Career

High school
Laure led the University of Santo Tomas (UST) Girls Volleyball Team to its last championship in Season 76 of UAAP Juniors Volleyball. She was hailed as best attacker and most valuable player. She also received the Best Server award in Season 74 and Best Receiver in Season 75.

Collegiate
Laure debuted her collegiate career playing for UST Golden Tigresses as a guest player in Shakey's V-League 11th Season 1st Conference. UST reached the semi-finals but failed to finish in podium losing to Adamson University. Laure received the Best Scorer Award of the conference. After her impressive debut in SVL, Laure played for UST in UAAP Season 77. UST failed to reach the final 4, losing to FEU Tamaraws. Laure was declared Rookie of the Year along with Kathleen Arado of UE.

In her sophomore year, Laure and UST joined the Shakey's V-League 12th Season Collegiate Conference. UST settled as fourth placer losing to FEU Lady Tamaraws and she won 2nd Best Open Hitter Award. In UAAP Season 78, Laure was announced as the team captain. UST failed to advance in Final 4 and settled as sixth placer. In the latter part of 2016, Laure led the UST Golden Tigresses in Shakey's V-League 13th Season Reinforced Open Conference competing against club teams and collegiate teams in the Philippines. She led the Golden Tigresses into the semi-finals, the only collegiate team to do so; they finished in fourth place and she won 2nd Best Open Hitter Award. They also participated in UNIGAMES 2016 in Bacolod where they were declared the champion, defeating University of Perpetual Help System Dalta.

UAAP Season 79
Laure led the Golden Tigresses to a third-place podium finish in UAAP Season 79, its 23rd appearance in the Final Four after four years. She ended as the league's third-best scorer, eighth-best spiker, and fifth-best digger.

Laure, together with Rondina, snatched the back-to-back championship after defeating the DLSU Lady Spikers in the 2017 University Games held in Dumaguete.

Foton Tornadoes
Laure made her debut in semi-professional volleyball joining the Foton Tornadoes in 2016 PSL All-Filipino Conference where her team ended as a runner-up and claimed the back-to-back Philippine Super Liga Grand Prix Conference title the same year. As part of the championship line-up of Foton Tornadoes, Laure played in 2016 Sealect Tuna Women's Volleyball Championship and 2016 Asian Club Championship. She was awarded as 1st Best Open Hitter last 2017 PSL All-Filipino Conference and her team placed fourth after the conference. She won the bronze medal in the 2017 PSL Grand Prix Conference.

International
Laure was part of the Philippine youth team that participated at the 2015 Asian Women's U23 Volleyball Championship which was held in Pasig, Philippines.

Personal life
Laure is from a family of athletes. She is the daughter of Eddie Laure, a professional basketball player who earned the titles "The Dominator" and "The Bounty Hunter" in his stint in the PBA, and Jovie Laure. Her younger sister, Eya Laure, plays as a utility spiker for the girls' volleyball team of UST High School. Her younger brother, Eco Laure, is a member of the boys' basketball team of NU. She is currently studying at University of Santo Tomas and taking BS Sports and Wellness Management. 

On September 3, 2020 Laure posted on Instagram a birthday video of her young boyfriend Bugoy Cariño, showcasing their first baby Scarlet Cariño.

Clubs
 Foton Tornadoes (2016)
 Chery Tiggo Crossovers (2022-present)

Awards

Individuals
  UAAP Season 74 Juniors "Best Server"
  UAAP Season 75 Juniors "Best Receiver"
  UAAP Season 76 Juniors "Best Attacker"
  UAAP Season 76 Juniors "Conference Most Valuable Player"
  UAAP Season 77 Seniors "Rookie of the Year"
 Shakey's V-League Season 11 1st Conference "Best Scorer"
 Shakey's V-League Season 12 Collegiate Conference "2nd Best Outside Hitter"
 Shakey's V-League Season 13 Reinforced Conference "2nd Best Outside Hitter"
 2017 PSL All-Filipino Conference "1st Best Outside Spiker"

Clubs
 2016 Philippine Superliga All-Filipino –  Silver medal, with Foton Tornadoes
 2016 Philippine Superliga Grand Prix –  Gold medal, with Foton Tornadoes
 2017 Philippine Superliga Grand Prix –  Bronze medal, with Foton Tornadoes

References

1997 births
Living people
University Athletic Association of the Philippines volleyball players
University of Santo Tomas alumni
Philippines women's international volleyball players
Filipino women's volleyball players
Opposite hitters
21st-century Filipino women